West Albany High School is a public high school in Albany, Oregon, United States.

West Albany High School was formerly named Albany Union High School prior to the completion of South Albany High School in 1972.

Academics
In 2008, 93% of the school's seniors received their high school diploma. Of 325 students, 303 graduated, 13 dropped out, four received a modified diploma, and five stayed on for another year.

Activities
Several sports teams and activities at West Albany have won state championships:
 Boys golf: 1974, 1997, 2008, 2009, 2013
 Girls softball:  2011
 Football:  2007, 2008, 2013
 Boys water polo: 2006, 2007,2010
 Girls water polo: 2007,2011, 2012, 2013, 2016
 Boys 4 × 100 m relay: 2008, 2013
 Varsity cheerleading: 1997, 1998, 2009, 2010, 2011
 Wind Ensemble: 2011, 2014, 2019
 Dance/drill team: 1987, 1993, 1994, 1998, 1999, 2007

Any championships won between 2015 and 2018 were under the 6A classification.

Attempted massacre
On May 27, 2013, a junior who was attending the school was found with an arsenal of explosives under the floorboards of his bedrooms. The explosives included a Molotov cocktail, a napalm bomb, and Drano bombs. He supposedly wanted to make a more "successful version" of the Columbine High School massacre. He was charged with attempted aggravated murder and six counts each of unlawful possession and manufacture of a destructive device. He is held on $2 million bail.

Notable alumni
Mike Barrett, sports announcer
Rick Haselton, judge
Ardyth Kennelly, writer
Ron Saxton, politician

References

High schools in Linn County, Oregon
Buildings and structures in Albany, Oregon
Educational institutions established in 1953
Public high schools in Oregon
1953 establishments in Oregon